Davis Richard Cleveland (born February 5, 2002) is an American child actor.  He is known for his role as Flynn Jones on the Disney Channel original series Shake It Up. Cleveland starred as Manny in the 2016 Nickelodeon Original Movie Rufus and its 2017 sequel Rufus 2.

Life and career
Cleveland was born on February 5, 2002, in Houston, Texas.  Cleveland was living in Los Angeles, California, in 2011, and enjoys studying martial arts and playing guitar, as well as other hobbies including video games, skateboarding and rollerblading.  He is involved in charity work by helping to raise money to help find a cure for cystic fibrosis through hosting cystic fibrosis walks and various other charities.

In 2010 Cleveland began playing the role of Flynn Jones on the Disney Channel comedy Shake It Up. In March 2011, he spoke with Tanya Rivero on Good Morning America of his experience working on Shake It Up stating, "It's the best experience ever.  It's like Disney World every morning."

His other television appearances include an episode of How I Met Your Mother, Desperate Housewives  and Good Luck Charlie, Ghost Whisperer, and Hannah Montana. He also played the part of Luther's little brother Roy in Zeke and Luther.

In January 2016, Cleveland starred in the Nickelodeon Original Movie, Rufus, which also starred Jace Norman. In January 2017 he starred in the film's sequel Rufus 2.

Filmography

Awards and nominations

References

External links
 
 

2002 births
21st-century American male actors
Male actors from Houston
American male child actors
American male television actors
Living people